Khao Thamon railway station is a railway station located in Don Yang Subdistrict, Phetchaburi City, Phetchaburi.

Services 
 Ordinary 251/252 Bang Sue Junction-Prachuap Khiri Khan-Bang Sue Junction
 Ordinary 254/255 Lang Suan-Thon Buri-Lang Suan
 Ordinary 261/262 Bangkok-Hua Hin-Bangkok

References 

Railway stations in Thailand